The Government College University Faisalabad (GCUF) is a public university located in Faisalabad, Punjab, Pakistan.

History
The institute was established as a primary school in 1897 in the present building of Government College for Women, Karkhana Bazar, Faisalabad. It was promoted to high school and intermediate college in 1905 and 1924 respectively. In 1933, it was elevated to the degree level and postgraduate disciplines were introduced in 1963. Government of the Punjab declared it as an autonomous institution in 1990. It was further given the status of university in 2002.

Faculties
 Arts and Social Sciences
 Economics and Management Sciences
 Engineering
 Islamic and Oriental Learning
 Life Sciences
 Pharmaceutical Sciences
 Physical Sciences

References

External links
 GCUF official website

Public universities in Punjab, Pakistan
Educational institutions established in 1897
1897 establishments in India
Public universities and colleges in Punjab, Pakistan
Education in Faisalabad
Government College University Faisalabad
Engineering universities and colleges in Pakistan